Polak is the Polish noun for a Pole (also in several other Slavic languages). It is also a surname. In 2020 there were over 21,500 persons with the surname in Poland.

Notable people with the surname include:

 A. Polak Daniels (1842–1891), Dutch chess master
 Abraham Polak (1910–1970), Israeli historian, professor at the Tel Aviv University
 Ada Polak (1914–2010), Norwegian art historian
 Anna Dresden-Polak (1906–1943), née Polak, Jewish Dutch gymnast
 Anna Sophia Polak (1874—1943), Jewish feminist and author
 Ben Polak (born 1961), British professor of economics
 Benedykt Polak (c.1200–c.1280), Polish Franciscan friar, traveler, explorer and interpreter
 Bojan Polak (1918–2004), Yugoslav military officer, politician, and athlete
 Boris Polak (born 1954), Israeli world champion and Olympic sport shooter
 Carel Polak (1909–1981), Dutch politician
 Christian Polak (born 1950), French businessman and author
 Clark Polak (1937–1980), American businessman, publisher, journalist, and LGBT activist
 Eleni-Klaoudia Polak (born 1996), Greek athlete specialising in the pole vault
 Elza Polak (1910–1995), Yugoslav horticulturist 
 Elżbieta Polak (born 1959), Polish politician
 Eric Polak, American fantasy artist 
 David Polak, American business executive and philanthropist from Beverly Hills, California
 Fred Polak (1907–1985), Dutch sociologist and politician
 Gottlieb Polak (1883–1942), Chief Rider and Riding Master of the horses Spanish Riding School
 Graham Polak (born 1984), Australian Football League player
 Hanna Polak (born 1967), Polish director, cinematographer and producer
 Henri Polak (1868–1943), Dutch trade unionist and politician
 Henry Polak (1882–1959), British humanist
 Jacques J. Polak (1914–2010), Dutch economist
 Jakob Eduard Polak (1818–1891), Austrian physician active in Iran
 Jakub Polak (musician) (1545–1605), Polish musician
 Jakub Polák (anarchist) (1952–2012), Czech anarchist and Roma rights activist
 Jason Polak (born 1968), Australian soccer player
 Jo-Anne Polak (born 1959), first woman executive in the Canadian Football League
 Julia Polak (1939–2014), Argentine-born British pathologist
 Kyle Polak (born 1984), American goalkeeper 
 Maralyn Lois Polak, American writer
 Marcin Polak (born 1982), Polish Paralympic cyclist
 Marek Polak (born 1963), Polish politician
 Mary Polak (born 1967/68), Canadian politician
 Maximilien Polak (born 1930), Dutch-born Canadian judge and politician
 Minus Polak (1928–2014), Dutch lawyer, politician, judge
 Mira Adanja Polak (born 1942), Serbian journalist, author and TV host
 Miroslav Polak (born 1958), Serbian football manager and player
 Monique Polak, writer 
 Nate Polak (born 1989), American soccer player
 Paul Polak, Czech-born American businessman
 Patrycja Polak (born 1991), Polish volleyball player
 Rainer Polak, ethnomusicologist and djembe drummer 
 Richard Polak (1870–1957), Dutch photographer
 Roman Polák (born 1986), Czech ice hockey player
 Ryszard Polak (1959–2017), Polish footballer 
 Sacha Polak (born 1982), Dutch film director
 Sjaak Polak (born 1976), Dutch footballer
 Stuart Polak, Baron Polak (born 1961), British politician and member of the House of Lords
 Tadeusz Polak (born 1944), Polish footballer
 Tyler Polak (born 1992), American soccer player
 Vojtěch Polák (born 1985), Czech ice hockey player
 Wim Polak (1924–1999), Dutch politician
 Wojciech Polak (born 1964), Roman Catholic archbishop of Gniezno, Poland
 Vasek Polak (1914–1997), race car driver and racing team owner
 Željko Polak (born 1976), Bosnian-Herzegovinian footballer

See also 
 
 Polack (surname)
 Polack, a derogatory term
 Polák
 Polášek
 Poliakoff
 Pollack, a surname
 Pollak, a surname
 Polyakov

References

Slavic-language surnames
Ethnonymic surnames